Toen Was Geluk Heel Gewoon (Then Happiness Was Common) was a popular Dutch sitcom broadcast on KRO from January 2, 1994 till June 3, 2009. It's a Dutch adaptation of the American sitcom The Honeymooners starring Gerard Cox and Sjoerd Pleijsier in the respective roles of bus-driver Jaap Kooiman and journalist Simon Stokvis.

Running gags
Jaap easily takes offence to Simon's remarks; he responds by moving his finger back and forth towards the door, indicating Simon to get out and ultimately raising his voice. 

Dutch television sitcoms
1994 Dutch television series debuts
2009 Dutch television series endings
1990s Dutch television series
2000s Dutch television series
The Honeymooners
NPO 1 original programming
NPO 2 original programming